Protracta is a genus of moths in the subfamily Arctiinae. It contains the single species Protracta illuminata, which is found in Bolivia.

References

Arctiinae